Toh Guan MRT station is a future elevated Mass Rapid Transit (MRT) station on the Jurong Region line (JRL) in Jurong East, Singapore. Announced on 9 May 2018, it will be constructed as part of Phase 2 of the JRL.

The station is located in the Jurong East planning area at the junction of Toh Guan Road and Jurong East Avenue 1 to the north.

History
On 9 May 2018, LTA announced that Toh Guan station would be part of the proposed Jurong Region line (JRL). The station will be constructed as part of Phase 2, JRL (East), consisting of 7 stations between Tengah and Pandan Reservoir, and is expected to be completed in 2028.

Contract J109 for the design and construction of Toh Guan Station and associated viaducts was awarded to Daewoo Engineering & Construction Co. Pte Ltd - Yongnam Engineering and Construction Pte Ltd Joint Venture at a sum of S$320.4 million in July 2020. Construction is expected to start in 2020. Contract J109 also includes the design and construction of the Jurong Town Hall and Pandan Reservoir stations and the  associated viaducts.

Initially expected to open in 2027, the restrictions on the construction due to the COVID-19 pandemic has led to delays in the JRL line completion, and the date was pushed to 2028.

Location
The station complex will be straddled over the existing Jurong East Central, with the junction with Toh Guan Road and Jurong East Avenue 1 to the north, and the junction with Jurong East Street 21 to the south. It is located in the Jurong East planning area between the Yuhua East and Toh Guan Subzones, parallel to the North South line approach tracks to Jurong East station, nested within housing estates.

Access to the station will be via 2 exits on each side of Jurong East Central.

References

Mass Rapid Transit (Singapore) stations
Proposed railway stations in Singapore
Railway stations scheduled to open in 2028